Those may refer to:
 those, plural English distal demonstrative (the plural of the word that)
 Those, Nepal